Gereb Segen is a reservoir located in the Hintalo Wajirat woreda of the Tigray Region in Ethiopia. The earthen dam that holds the reservoir was built in 2000 by SAERT.

Dam characteristics 
 Dam height: 14.86 metres
 Dam crest length: 473 metres
 Spillway width: 8 metres

Capacity 
 Original capacity: 337408 m³
 Dead storage: 22400 m³
 Reservoir area: 11.7 ha
In 2002, the life expectancy of the reservoir (the duration before it is filled with sediment) was estimated at 25 years.

Irrigation 
 Designed irrigated area: 24 ha
 Actual irrigated area in 2002: zero ha

Environment 

The catchment of the reservoir is 3.53 km² large, with a perimeter of 11.66 km and a length of 5200 metres. The reservoir suffers from rapid siltation. The lithology of the catchment is Agula Shale. Part of the water that could be used for irrigation is lost through seepage; the positive side-effect is that this contributes to groundwater recharge.

Homonymous places 
There is a (much larger) dam with the same name, some 20 km to the northwest: Gereb Segen (May Gabat)

References 

Reservoirs in Ethiopia
2000 establishments in Ethiopia
Tigray Region
Agriculture in Ethiopia
Water in Ethiopia